The Maolin National Scenic Area is a national scenic area in Kaohsiung and Pingtung County of Taiwan.

Geology
The scenic area is located at the western side of Central Mountain Range foothill which covers three rivers. It is located within the boundary of Sandimen Township of Pingtung County and Maolin and Liouguei districts of Kaohsiung City. The average temperature of the area is 24 °C.

Facilities
The scenic area features various hotels and other lodging facilities.

Seasonal Activities

Austronesian Wedding (March) 
The Austronesian wedding ceremony is a seasonal activity which combined with the traditional wedding of the aborigines based on the Majia Township of the Northern Pingtung, Sandimen Township, Paiwan of Wutai Township and Rukai, presented by Maolin National Scenic Area Management Office.

Purple Crow Butterflies Watching (November to March) 
Every year in winter, the highlight of the Maolin National Scenic Area is the arrival of thousands and thousands of purple crow butterflies across the ocean to stay for the winter.

Fetrip of Whispering Flowers in the Mountains (November to January) 
The Liouguei area of Kaohsiung County has the largest number of hot springs resources of all Southern Taiwan, and includes almost 40 hot spring hotels.

Transportation
The area is accessible by bus from Kaohsiung Main Station.

See also
 Geography of Taiwan

References

External links

 

Geography of Kaohsiung
Geography of Pingtung County
National scenic areas of Taiwan